The detective radio drama Yours Truly, Johnny Dollar aired on the CBS Radio network from February 18, 1949, until September 30, 1962. Each weekly episode was 30 minutes in duration. However, during Bob Bailey's first year in the role, each story comprised five 15-minute episodes, airing Monday through Friday. There were two exceptions: "The Kranesburg Matter" comprised six episodes, and "The Phantom Chase Matter" comprised nine.

Actor list

Notes

Episode list

1948–1950: Dick Powell & Charles Russell

1950–1952: Edmond O'Brien

1952–1954: John Lund

1955–1960: Gerald Mohr (audition) & Bob Bailey

1960–1962: Bob Readick & Mandel Kramer

Notes

Lists of radio series episodes